Priolskoye is a rural locality (a selo) in Starooskolsky District, Belgorod Oblast, Russia. The population was 183 as of 2010. There are 4 streets.

Geography 
Priolskoye is located 33 km south of Stary Oskol (the district's administrative centre) by road. Nikolayevka is the nearest rural locality.

References 

Rural localities in Starooskolsky District